Ken Hunt may refer to:

Ken Hunt (outfielder) (1934–1997), Major League Baseball outfielder (1959–1964)
Ken Hunt (pitcher) (1938–2008), Major League Baseball pitcher (1961)
Ken Hunt (music journalist) born 1951, English music critic, journalist, broadcaster and translator
Kenneth Hunt (footballer) (1884–1949), English Olympic footballer
Kenneth Hunt (cricketer) (1902–1971), English cricketer
Kenneth H. Hunt (1920–2002), Australian professor of kinematics